Wesley Sonck (born 9 August 1978) is a Belgian professional football manager and former player who manages the Belgium U19 national team. He played as a striker for Molenbeek, Germinal Ekeren, Germinal Beerschot, Genk, Ajax, Borussia Mönchengladbach and Club Brugge. He was capped by Belgium at international level.

During his time with Genk, he was the top goalscorer in the Belgian First Division in the 2001–02 season with 30 goals, and joint top in the following campaign with 22 – sharing the award with Cédric Roussel.

Club career

Ajax
Sonck moved to Ajax in the summer of 2003, to replace departed striker Mido. He made his debut on 12 August against Grazer AK. He scored his first goal for the club 13 September against RKC Waalwijk. Sonck never really made it in Amsterdam, partly because he was playing on the right wing a lot under coach Ronald Koeman. He moved to Borussia Mönchengladbach in the winter of 2004.

Borussia Mönchengladbach
Sonck's time with Borussia Mönchengladbach of the Bundesliga was hampered by injuries. Mönchengladbach signed him on a permanent contract, a deal initially arranged already at the start of his loan. In the summer of 2005, Sonck had three of his ribs broken after a horrific tackle by Wilfred Bouma in a goalless, meaningless friendly between Borussia Mönchengladbach and PSV Eindhoven. Sonck took six months to recover, marking his return to competitive football with a goal in a 3–1 defeat by Bayern Munich. He scored three more in 13 further Bundesliga games for Mönchengladbach until he was forced out for three months with an injury in the hollow of his knee at the start of the 2006–07 season.

Back to Belgium
Sonck left Gladbach at the end of the 2006–07 season, joining Club Brugge on a year-long loan deal while Borussia Mönchengladbach began playing in the second tier of the Bundesliga. Following the 2007–08 season, Sonck joined Brugge permanently for an undisclosed fee. At the end of the 2009–10 season, Sonck left Brugge to join Lierse S.K. on a free transfer having fallen out with manager Adrie Koster over contract negotiations and lack of first team action. Amongst his first goals for the club was an excellent overhead kick. Sonck was released in the summer of 2012 and spent a few months unemployed before joining newly promoted Waasland-Beveren near the end of October 2012. In January 2014 signed with 1ste Provincial Oost-Vlaanderen club KE Appelterre-Eichem, before retiring just three months later.

International career
Sonck was called for the Belgium national team during the 2010 World Cup qualifiers. In the match versus Spain he scored Belgium's only goal in that match, thus ending Casillas and Reina's undefeated streak of 710 minutes.

Coaching career
On 3 August 2017, Sonck was hired as manager of the Belgian U18 national team. In March 2020, he was put in charge of the U-19 national team.

Career statistics

Club

International

Scores and results list Belgium's goal tally first, score column indicates score after each Sonck goal.

Honours and awards
Genk
 Belgian First Division: 2001–02

Ajax
 Eredivisie: 2003–04

Individual
 Belgian Golden Shoe: 2001
Goal of the Season: 2001
 Belgian Professional Footballer of the Year: 2001–02
 Belgian First Division A top scorer: 2001–02 (30 goals), 2002–03 (22 goals) 
 Honorary citizen of Ninove: 2021

References

External links

 
 Belgium Stats at Belgian FA

1978 births
Living people
People from Ninove
Footballers from East Flanders
Association football forwards
Belgian footballers
R.W.D. Molenbeek players
Beerschot A.C. players
K.R.C. Genk players
AFC Ajax players
Borussia Mönchengladbach players
Club Brugge KV players
Lierse S.K. players
S.K. Beveren players
Belgian Pro League players
Eredivisie players
Bundesliga players
Belgium international footballers
2002 FIFA World Cup players
Belgian expatriate footballers
Expatriate footballers in the Netherlands
Belgian expatriate sportspeople in the Netherlands
Expatriate footballers in Germany
Belgian expatriate sportspeople in Germany